The following table shows the world record progression in the men's and women's 800 metres, officially ratified by the IAAF.

Men
The first world record in the men's 800 metres was recognized by the International Association of Athletics Federations in 1912.

As of June 21, 2011, 23 world records have been ratified by the IAAF in the event. "y" denotes time for 880 yards (804.68 m) ratified as a record for the 800 m.

(+) - indicates en route time from longer race.

The "Time" column indicates the ratified mark; the "Auto" column indicates a fully automatic time that was also recorded in the event when hand-timed marks were used for official records, or which was the basis for the official mark, rounded to the 10th of a second, depending on the rules then in place.

Auto times to the hundredth of a second were accepted by the IAAF for events up to and including 10,000 m from 1981. Hence, Sebastian Coe's record at 1:42.4 was rendered as 1:42.33 from that year.

Women

As of June 21, 2009, the IAAF (and the FSFI before it) have ratified 29 world records in the event. "y" denotes time for 880 yards (804.672 m) ratified as a record for the 800 m.

(+) - indicates en route time from longer race.
(*) - Zdeněk Koubek's world records were rescinded by the IAAF after he transitioned to become male.

The "Time" column indicates the ratified mark; the "Auto" column indicates a fully automatic time that was also recorded in the event when hand-timed marks were used for official records, or which was the basis for the official mark, rounded to the 10th of a second, depending on the rules then in place. 

Auto times to the hundredth of a second were accepted by the IAAF for events up to and including 10,000 m from 1981. Hence, Nadezhda Olizarenko's record at 1:53.5 was rendered as 1:53.43 from that year.

This is the progression of world record improvements of the 800 metres M50 division of Masters athletics.

Key

Masters M50 800 metres world record progression

References

World athletics record progressions
World record
Masters athletics world record progressions